Bergkamp is a surname. Notable people with the surname include:

 Dennis Bergkamp (born 1969), Dutch footballer and coach
 Roland Bergkamp (born 1991), Dutch footballer
 Vera Bergkamp (born 1971), Dutch politician

Dutch-language surnames
German-language surnames